Blignaut is an Afrikaans surname, derived from the French Blignault/Blignot. It may refer to:
Aegidius Jean Blignaut (1899–1994), South African author
Alex Blignaut (1932–2001), racing driver and motor racing team owner from South Africa
Andy Blignaut (born 1978), Zimbabwean cricketer
 Christian August Blignaut (1897–1974), aka Chris Blignaut and Harold Wise, South African prolific singer/songwriter (see Afrikaans Wikipedia)
Nikolai Blignaut (born 1985), South African rugby union player
Pieter Jeremias Blignaut (1841–1909), South African (Boer) civil servant and Acting State President
Toek Blignaut (1922–2007) was a South African writer

See also
 Blignault

Afrikaans-language surnames
Surnames of French origin